Events in the year 2022 in Guyana.

Incumbents 

 President: Irfaan Ali
 Prime Minister: Mark Phillips

Events 
Ongoing — COVID-19 pandemic in Guyana

Sports 

 July 29 – August 8: Guyana at the 2022 Commonwealth Games
 August 9 – August 18: Guyana at the 2021 Islamic Solidarity Games

Deaths 

 January 11 – Khaleel Mohammed, religious leader (born 1955)
 February 17 – Balram Singh Rai,  politician, minister of home affairs (1961–1962) (born 1921)
 May 11 – Ian Hall, musician (born 1940)
 August 31 – Mary Noel Menezes, historian (born 1930)
 September 1 – Rashleigh Jackson, politician, minister for foreign affairs (1978–1990) (born 1929)

See also 

 List of years in Guyana

References 

 
2020s in Guyana
Years of the 21st century in Guyana
Guyana
Guyana